Bhalwal Tehsil (Punjabi,) is a tehsil of Sargodha District in the Punjab province of Pakistan. It is administratively subdivided into 53 union councils, four of which form the tehsil capital Bhalwal.

Notable People

1) Dr Mukhtar Bharath - MNA

2) Adnan Hayat Noon - Industrialist, Ex Federal Minister

3) Mehr Ghulam Dastagir Lak - Landlord, Industrialist, Ex Minister

4) Ch. Sohail Gujjar - Politician, Businessman

5) Mehr Rabnawaz Lak - Ex MPA

6) Malik Azam Noon - Polo Player

7) Zafar Abbas Lak - Politician, Ex IG Police

8) Khaliqdad Parhar - Politician

Administration 
The tehsil is administratively subdivided into the following union councils:

References

Sargodha District
Tehsils of Punjab, Pakistan
Populated places in Sargodha District